Jeffrey Jackson Wedgwood Julian (July 29, 1961 – July 15, 2004) was an American professional golfer on the PGA Tour. He was the grandson of Basketball Hall of Fame coach Doggie Julian.

After a failed attempt to walk on at Clemson University, Julian returned to New England, turned pro, and began earning his PGA of America class A status.

Julian played on what is now the Web.com Tour in 1990 and 1997 to 2000, winning the Nike Dominion Open in 1997. He played on the PGA Tour in 1996 and 2001 after earning his PGA Tour card through Q-School. He played the 2002 PGA Tour season on sponsor's exemptions.

Julian was diagnosed with Amyotrophic lateral sclerosis (ALS, also known as Lou Gehrig's Disease) in October 2001. He succumbed to ALS in July 2004 and is survived by his wife Kimberly, and two sons, Keegan, and Tyler.

Julian played in three U.S. Opens at Medinah in 1990, Shinnecock Hills in 1995, and Oakland Hills in 1996.

Julian also won the 1992 Greater Bangor Open, the 1995 New England Open, and the 2000 Cape Cod Open. He was the recipient of the Ben Hogan Award in 2002.

Professional wins (4)

Nike Tour wins (1)

Other wins (3) 
 1992 Greater Bangor Open
 1995 New England Open
 2000 Cape Cod Open

Results in major championships 

CUT = missed the halfway cut
Note: Julian only played in the U.S. Open.

See also 
 1995 PGA Tour Qualifying School graduates
 2000 PGA Tour Qualifying School graduates

References

External links 
 

American male golfers
PGA Tour golfers
Golfers from Maine
Golfers from Vermont
Clemson University alumni
Sportspeople from Portland, Maine
People from Norwich, Vermont
Neurological disease deaths in Vermont
Deaths from motor neuron disease
1961 births
2004 deaths